Pągów  is a village in the administrative district of Gmina Wilków, within Namysłów County, Opole Voivodeship, in south-western Poland.

History
The village dates back to the Middle Ages. Within Piast-ruled Poland, it was the location of a motte-and-bailey castle from the 13th-14th century, which is now an archaeological site. In the 18th century, the village was annexed by Prussia, and from 1871 to 1945 it was also part of Germany, before it became again part of Poland following Germany's defeat in World War II.

References

Villages in Namysłów County
Archaeological sites in Poland